The Howard L. and Vivian W. Lott House located at 311 East Kilpatrick Street in Mineola, Wood County, Texas, is a house designed in the Prairie School style with classical details. It is a Recorded Texas Historic Landmark and is listed on the National Register of Historic Places.

History
The house was designed by architect J. J. McLeon for Angus and Lena Beaird. Construction began in 1918 and was completed in the early 1920s. The Beaird family sold the home to Howard and Vivian Lott in 1928.

The house was named a Recorded Texas Historic Landmark in 1996 and was added to the National Register of Historic Places in 1998.

See also

National Register of Historic Places listings in Wood County, Texas
Recorded Texas Historic Landmarks in Wood County

References

External links

National Register of Historic Places in Wood County, Texas
Recorded Texas Historic Landmarks
Prairie School architecture
Houses completed in 1928